The Rainbow Cubby House is the third book in the Learn to Include series, written by Brenna Harding and her lesbian mother Vicki (who could not find any readers featuring same-sex families to donate to her daughter's school). It is for beginner readers or for reading aloud.

The book is about the narrator Brenna, her two mums, her friend Jed and his two dads building a cubby house in the backyard.

The series, and this book in particular, were at the centre of a controversy involving a day care centre using books that feature characters from same-sex parent families.  New South Wales Premier Morris Iemma said of the issue: "I do not personally believe it appropriate for two-year-olds to be dragged into the gay rights debate."

See also
 Heather Has Two Mommies: similar book with more controversy in the United States

References 

Children's books with LGBT themes
2000s LGBT literature
LGBT in Australia
2005 children's books
Australian children's books
LGBT literature in Australia